Ramkumar Mukhopadhyay (born 8 March 1956) is a Bengali writer from India. He has written novels and short stories for both adults and children.

Life
Ramkumar Mukhopadhyay was born in Calcutta
His father was Ramangamohan Mukhopadhyay and mother Kanaklata Mukhopadhyay. He graduated from Ramakrishna Mission Vidyamandir (a residential college) at Belur
before taking a Masters in English from The University of Calcutta. He did his Ph.D from Jadavpur University.
Mukhopadhyay started his career as Regional Secretary, East India, of Sahitya Akademi. Formerly he was Convener of the Bengali Advisory Board of the Sahitya Akademi. He was also President of the Bharatiya Bhasha Parishad. He has retired as the Director of the Publishing Department, Visva-Bharati. 
He is associated with a number of Bengali Little Magazines.

Works

His first collection of 14 short stories entitled "Madale Natun Bol" (The New Beats on the Drum)  published from Calcutta in 1984. His first novel "Charane Prantare" (At the Grazing Ground, at the Horizon) was published from Calcutta in 1993.

Novel

Short story collection

Travelogue

Book of essays

Compiled and edited

Juvenile literature

Awards

 Somenchandra Award of Paschimbanga Bangla Akademi (2000) 
 Galpamela Puraskar (2004)
 Katha Award (New Delhi, 2005)
 Bankimchandra Smriti Puraskar of the Department of Higher Education, Govt. of West Bengal (2006)
 Saratchandra Smriti Puraskar (Bhagalpur, 2007)
 Sis Puraskar (2008)
 Gajendra Kumar Mitra Birth Centenary Award 2009
 Ananda Puraskar of the Ananda Bazar Patrika and Desh (2013)
 D.L.Ray Award (2014)
 Kusumanjali Award (New Delhi, 2014)
 Krititwa Samagra Puraskar of Bharatiya Bhasha Parisad (2016)

References 

Bengali writers
Writers from Kolkata
1956 births
Living people
University of Calcutta alumni
Recipients of the Ananda Purashkar
People from Bankura district